Humber-Gros Morne is a provincial electoral district in Newfoundland and Labrador. As of 2011 there are 12,509 people living in the district.

Humber-Gros Morne includes part of the former district of St. Barbe and most of the former district of Humber Valley. The district was created following the 2015 electoral districts boundaries review.

The district includes Deer Lake and surrounding communities (Howley and Reidville) as well as the southern half of the Great Northern Peninsula. Bellburns is the district's northern limit on the west side and Jackson's Arm is the northern limit on the east side. Other notable communities in this district include Cormack, Cow Head, Hampden and Rocky Harbour.

The district was formerly represented by Premier Dwight Ball until his resignation. The district is currently represented by Premier Andrew Furey.

Members of the House of Assembly
The district has elected the following Members of the House of Assembly:

Election results

|-

|-

|-

References

Newfoundland and Labrador provincial electoral districts
2015 establishments in Newfoundland and Labrador